Charlotte Bonnet (born 14 February 1995) is a French swimmer, who won a bronze medal at the 2012 Summer Olympics. Bonnet was born in Enghien-les-Bains, Paris. Her 4 × 200 m freestyle team won the bronze medal in a time of 7:47.49 (Camille Muffat 1:55.51; Bonnet 1:57.78; Ophélie-Cyrielle Étienne 1:58.05; Coralie Balmy 1:56.15).

On 1 January 2013, Bonnet was made a Knight (Chevalier) of the French National Order of Merit.

Filmografia 

Telewizja 

 2017: Lajk! - jako współprowadząca
 od 2017: Koło Fortuny - jako współprowadząca
 2018: Kocham cię, Polsko! - gościnnie jako uczestniczka
 2018: Big Music Quiz - gościnnie jako uczestniczka
 2018: Familiada - gościnnie jako uczestniczka
 2019: Postaw na milion - gościnnie jako uczestniczka
 2019: Czar par - jako współprowadząca
 2019: Dzikie Ucho - gościnnie jako uczestniczka
 2020: Familiada - gościnnie jako uczestniczka
 od 2021: Pytanie na śniadanie - jako współprowadząca
 2021: Jaka to melodia? - gościnnie jako wykonawczyni piosenek
 od 2021: To był rok! - jako kapitan
 2022: Va banque - gościnnie jako uczestniczka
 2023: Kamper Polska - jako prowadząca

References

External links

1995 births
Knights of the Ordre national du Mérite
Living people
Olympic bronze medalists for France
Olympic bronze medalists in swimming
Olympic swimmers of France
Swimmers at the 2012 Summer Olympics
Swimmers at the 2016 Summer Olympics
Medalists at the 2012 Summer Olympics
World Aquatics Championships medalists in swimming
Medalists at the FINA World Swimming Championships (25 m)
French female freestyle swimmers
French female medley swimmers
People from Enghien-les-Bains
European Aquatics Championships medalists in swimming
Sportspeople from Val-d'Oise
Swimmers at the 2020 Summer Olympics
21st-century French women